Digital Vein is the fourth studio album by American singer-songwriter David Cook. It was released on September 18, 2015, through Cook's Analog Heart Music. The album features tracks co-written by Cook along with well-known songwriters such as Blair Daly, Zac Maloy, Kevin Griffin, Chad Carlson and David Hodges. Digital Vein is Cook's first studio album since he parted ways with RCA Records in 2012. The album was distributed through a deal with INgrooves Music Group.

Background
Cook began work on his third post-American Idol album in 2012 after parting ways with RCA and relocating to Nashville, Tennessee. Cook stated that working in Nashville opened him up creatively to trying different things and was unsure about whether he would make another record but he decided to write songs, have fun and to see what happens. Digital Vein was recorded in Cook's home studio, where he worked with his longtime friend Andy Skib, who engineered, and the rhythm section from his touring band, playing the bulk of the parts himself. Cook stated that “The whole thing was an experiment to see if (A) I could make a record this way, and (B) if I could enjoy doing it this way. I’m a control freak, and to have this level of control has been empowering. It was definitely a different process for me, but I can’t recall ever having more fun making a record.”

On October 25, 2014, Cook tweeted a photo of himself in the studio and on October 27, 2014, Cook tweeted "So stoked to be sharing this new music with you. Here we go!" along with a link to a new song snippet with the words coming soon.

On May 20, 2015, Cook announced that his upcoming studio album would be made available for pre-order on PledgeMusic. Cook stated that he was "beyond excited" to be working with PledgeMusic and was "intrigued by the opportunity that Pledge offers in bringing  fans into the process and partnering with them to bring this record to life."

The album's name, Digital Vein, and the track list for the standard edition were revealed on June 23, 2015. On June 26, 2015, the track list for the deluxe edition was released.

Album title

The album initially had the working title, Mirror Mirror. On the decision to name the album Digital Vein, Cook said, "My last independent record, back in 2006, was Analog Heart, and after my major-label journey, with circumstances being what they are, this record is certainly a progression. I don’t think it’s very much like Analog Heart at all, but the process of putting it together was similar in the sense that I worked with a very small team, and I put a lot of myself into every aspect of it. It felt like a throwback in that regard, so I wanted the two records to be connected, if only in name.”

Reception

Critical
Stephen Thomas Erlewine of AllMusic gave the album 3.5 out of 5 stars stating that "if it's unlikely Cook could bring this brand of mid-2000s mainstream rock into the Top 40 in 2015, he at least delivers an album that satisfies." Markos Papadatos of Digital Journal gave the album an 'A' rating, stating that "he is able to convey a wide spectrum of raw emotions with ease through his sincere storytelling."

Commercial
The album debuted at No. 35 on Billboard 200, No. 22 on Top Album Sales, No. 8 on Independent Albums and No. 7 on Internet Albums, with 11,000 sold on its debut week.

Promotion
To promote the album, Cook posted video updates, sneak peaks of the new music, photos and other things on his PledgeMusic page.

Singles
"Criminals" was released on July 31, 2015 and serves as the lead single from the album. Cook described the song as "lyrically ... a modern-day Bonnie and Clyde, young love against the world," and that it serves as a good synopsis for the record. The song was serviced to American hot adult contemporary radio on September 21, 2015.

"Broken Windows" was released and serviced to American hot adult contemporary radio on February 22, 2016 as the album's second single.

"Heartbeat" was released as a single on March 25, 2016. He performed the song on the fifteenth season finale of American Idol.

Other songs
"Laying Me Low" was released on April 30, 2013 through XIX Recordings, the record label of American Idol creator Simon Fuller. The song charted at number 36 on the Billboard Pop Digital Songs sales chart.

"Wait for Me" was released independently through Cook's label imprint Analog Heart Music on November 17, 2014.

An acoustic version of "Carry You" was released as a digital single from an acoustic EP that's only available on PledgeMusic. It was used as the season premiere of A&E’s Intervention on March 6, 2016.

Track listing

Personnel
Credits from AllMusic.

Vocals
David Cook — Primary artist
Nick Gibson — Vocals
Andy Skib — Vocals
Jennie Skib — Vocals

Production
Chad Carlson — Composer
David Cook — Composer, producer, programming 
Blair Daly — Composer
Jerry Flowers — Composer
Chase Foster — Composer
Nick Gibson — Technician 
Kevin Griffin — Composer
Chris Isaak — Composer
David Hodges — Composer
Zac Maloy — Composer
Steven Miller — Composer
Joe Palmaccio — Mastering
Chris Reardon — Composer, producer, programming
Andy Skib — Composer, engineer, programming
Greg Strizek — Mixing
Bruce Springsteen — Composer
Andy Waldeck — Composer

Instruments
Nick Adams — Drums
Monty Anderson — Bass guitar
David Cook — Guitar
Andy Skib — Guitar

Imagery
David Cook — Art direction, design
Rob Thacker — Photography
Dale Voelker — Art direction, design

Charts

Release history

References

2015 albums
David Cook (singer) albums